Hannah Francesca Katie Dodd (born 17 May 1995) is an English actress and model. She began her career in modeling and trained as a dancer before starring in the Hulu teen series Find Me in Paris (2018–2020). She has since appeared in the Netflix film Enola Holmes 2 (2022). She is set to play Francesca, the sixth Bridgerton child, in the period drama Bridgerton, also on Netflix.

Early life
Dodd was born in Colchester and grew up in Leavenheath on the Essex–Suffolk border. She attended Ormiston Sudbury Academy. She has been dancing since she was two years old. She took a course at Evolution Foundation College, of which she is now a patron, before going on to graduate with a Bachelor of Arts in Theatre Dance from the London Studio Centre in 2017.

Career
Dodd began her career in modeling and was 16 when she signed with Select Model Management, using the money she made from it to fund her dance training. She modeled for Primark, Topshop, Boden, and Monsoon Accessorize before landing a gig with Burberry in 2014 when she was 19 alongside Romeo Beckham.

In 2018, Dodd made her television debut in the Hulu series Find Me in Paris and Harlots as Thea Raphael, a main role, and Sophia Fitzwilliam, a recurring role respectively. She played Sandra, the illusionary adult form of Sprite in the 2021 Chloe Zhao-directed Marvel Cinematic Universe film Eternals. The following year, Dodd appeared as a young version of Sienna Miller's character during her university years in the 2022 Netflix miniseries Anatomy of a Scandal.

Also in 2022, Dodd played Sarah Chapman in the Netflix film Enola Holmes 2 and Corinne Foxworth in Flowers in the Attic: The Origin, a Lifetime miniseries prequel based on the novel Garden of Shadows. In May 2022, it was announced Dodd would replace Ruby Stokes in third series of the Shondaland-produced Netflix period drama Bridgerton as Francesca, the sixth Bridgerton child.

Filmography

Film

Television

Music video

References

External links
 
 Hannah Dodd at Olivia Bell Management

Living people
1995 births
Actresses from Essex
Actresses from Suffolk
English female dancers
English female models
People from Babergh District
People from Colchester
Select Model Management models